WXIZ (100.9 FM) is a radio station broadcasting a country music format. Licensed to Waverly, Ohio, United States, the station is currently owned by Crystal Communications Corporation and features programming from ABC Radio  and Jones Radio Network.

References

External links

XIZ